Solothurn Allmend railway station is a railway station in the municipality of Solothurn, in the Swiss canton of Solothurn. It is an intermediate stop on the standard gauge Jura Foot line of Swiss Federal Railways. The station opened on 15 December 2013.

Services
 the following services stop at Solothurn Allmend:

References

External links 
 
 

Railway stations in the canton of Solothurn
Swiss Federal Railways stations
Railway stations in Switzerland opened in 2013